"Clash of the Ash" is the first single from the Scottish Celtic rock band Runrig's thirteenth studio album Everything You See, which was released as a single in 2007. The song is about the sport of shinty and has become an anthem for the sport. Runrig have previously referenced shinty in the songs "Pride of the Summer" from The Cutter and the Clan and "Recovery" from the album of the same name.  The song also appeared on the 2013 compilation album Larry Kirwan's Celtic Invasion.

Themes
The song is about the sport of shinty and the first verse revolves around a team making their way to an away game, through "straths and glens".  Prominent throughout the song is the use of nicknames, which are a common element.

The second verse is a portrayal of a game against Kinlochshiel, the only shinty team named in the song in the line: But if we do all that and there’s no-one spareTell me who’s gonna mark the Kinlochshiel Bear. This verse refers to various positions on the shinty park as well as the sawdust, a reference to the penalty box aka the "D" which is often marked out with sawdust instead of paint.

The final verse references shinty's long history (shared with hurling) which stretches back to ancient Celtic history:
'And for every fighting Highland manStand by your brother, die for the clan.

The song also praises the amateur status of those who play the sport:These shinty boys shine like the sun.We don’t play for fame, we don’t play for cashWe just play for the glory, and the clash of the ash.

Live performance history
"Clash of the Ash" was played live at the "Year of the Flood" concert in 2007 featuring Gary Innes. It is usually played towards the end of a concert,
it was played live at the "Party on the Moor" concert in 2013 as the 27th song.

References

2007 singles
Shinty
Scottish songs
2007 songs
Sporting songs